Cranbourne Football Club is an Australian rules football team that competes in the South East Football Netball League. They are known as the Eagles.

History 
The history of the Cranbourne FC dates back to as far back as the 1890s after its 1889 foundation and was a founding club of the newly-formed Berwick District Football Association in 1910. Despite the ongoing wars in the 1910s and from 1939 to 1945, the club remained in the competition, which changed its name to the Dandenong District Football Association, until 1953 when it relocated to the South West Gippsland Football League as an inaugural member. Cranbourne struggled in its first few years of competition in the SWGFL but managed to claim its first senior flag in the new competition in 1966 but the 1980s was to be the Eagles' best era, winning seven flags from 1985 to 1993. The SWGFL was absorbed by the Mornington Peninsula Nepean Football League in 1995, just eight years after the merger of the two leagues. Cranbourne saw success early in the MPNFL's Northern division by beating Karingal by 8 points in the Grand Final. They began competing in the Casey Cardinia division of the league and contested in four consecutive grand finals from 2011 to 2014, but 2011 was the only year the Eagles came out victorious. 2015 saw the nine clubs competing in the Casey Cardinia division leave the MPNFL to start the South East Football Netball League. Cranbourne made the inaugural SEFNL grand final only to lose to Berwick but came back to beat the Wickers in 2016 15.9.99 to 9.11.65.

Premierships 
Berwick District Football Association: 1926

 South West Gippsland Football League: 1966, 1985, 1986, 1987, 1989, 1990, 1991, 1993
 Mornington Peninsula Nepean Football League: (date?)
 (Northern division): 1995
 (Casey Cardinia division): 2011
 South East Football Netball League: 2016

References

External links 
Cranbourne Football Netball Club Website

Australian rules football clubs established in 1889
1889 establishments in Australia
Sport in the City of Casey
Australian rules football clubs in Melbourne